The Sacramento Ballet was founded in 1954 by Barbara Crockett and Deane Crockett. During Ms. Crockett’s tenure as Company Director, The Sacramento Ballet gained national recognition as one of the finest regional ballet companies.  Through community support, the formation of the Ballet Guild, and grants from the Sacramento Metropolitan Arts Commission, California Arts Council, and the National Endowment for the Arts, the Ballet was able to grow and begin to hire a resident company of professional dancers.  In 1986, having accomplished her goal of making The Sacramento Ballet a professional company, Ms. Crockett retired as the Company Director.

In 1988 Ron Cunningham was engaged as Artistic Director, and was joined by his wife Carinne Binda the following year.  The two became Co-Artistic Directors in 1991.  The Sacramento Ballet is as well known for Cunningham’s world premieres of such works as Carmina Burana, The Rite of Spring and Bolero as it is for his classics, including The Nutcracker, Romeo and Juliet, and Cinderella.  The Ballet's audience has had the opportunity to experience a vast repertoire, including works by Septime Webre, David Parsons, Kathryn Posin, Agnes de Mille, Glen Tetley, Val Caniparoli, Trey McIntyre and Twyla Tharp.  In 18 seasons, the Ballet has added 13 full-length ballets, 18 Balanchine masterworks, 36 Sacramento premieres, and 34 world premieres.

The Sacramento Ballet has received annual funding from corporations, foundations and government agencies to support its operational and artistic growth, including: California Arts Council, National Endowment for the Arts, Sacramento Regional Foundation, Sacramento Metropolitan Arts Council, The James Irvine Foundation, Target Stores, Raley’s Stores and the McClatchy Company to name a few.  Since 1986, the company’s operating budget has grown steadily, and audience attendance has increased from 15,000 to over 80,000 each season. The Ballet remains the only Sacramento arts organization with a resident company of artists.

Former Sacramento Ballet company dancer Amy Seiwert took over the role of Artistic Director in 2018, and is committed to presenting audiences with an inspiring balance of classic repertoire and fresh new works.

Artists As of April 2010

 Ballet Mistress/Character Artist: Lynlee Towne
 Character Artist: Nolan T'Sani

Artists as of October 2012

 Ballet Mistress/Character Artist: Lynlee Towne
 Character Artist: Nolan T'Sani

Dancers

 Oliver-Paul Adams
 Alexander Cain Biber
 Lauren Breen
 Stefan Calka
 Ava Chatterson
 Alexandra Cunningham
 Roy Gan
 Nicole Haskins
 Chloe Horne
 Rachel Speidel Little
 Isha Lloyd
 Kaori Higashiyama
 Isha Lloyd
 Katie Miller
 Christopher B. Nachtrab
 Amanda Peet
 Richard Porter
 Richard Smith
 Mate Szentes
 Evelyn Turner
 Rex Wheeler
 Lauryn Winterhalder

Apprentices

 Alysia Chang
 Julia Feldman
 Karina Hagemeyer
 Sarah Hicks
 Jackson Jirard 
 Mila Louise Lavoie
 Jarrett Reimers
 Maggie Rupp
 Alex Stewart

Trainees
 Christine Nankervis

Artists as of August 2015

Dancers 

 Alexander Cain Biber
 Lauren Breen
 Stefan Calka
 Ava Chatterson
 Alexandra Cunningham
 Julia Feldman
 Kaori Higashiyama
 Iver Johnson
 Dylan Keane
 Larissa Kogut
 Katie Miller
 Christopher B. Nachtrab
 Richard Porter
 Karina Hagemeyer
 Maggie Rupp
 Richard Smith
 Evelyn Turner
 Rex Wheeler
 John Whisler
 Lauryn Winterhalder

Apprentices 

 Anthony Cannarella
 Colleen Kerwin
 Shania Rasmussen
 Isabella Velasquez
 Laura Whitby

Trainees 
 
 Brittney Almendariz
 Audrey Mathias
 Emily Tan
 Solana Tanabe

Artists as of August 2019

Dancers 

 Isaac Bates-Vinueza
 Alexander Cain Biber
 Bobby Briscoe
 Stefan Calka
 Anthony Cannarella
 Frances Chae
 Ava Chatterson
 Alexandra Cunningham
 Regina DuPont
 Julia Feldman
 Kaori Higashiyama
 Michelle Katcher
 Dylan Keane
 Richard Porter
 Shania Rasmussen
 Richard Smith
 Sally Turkel
 Isabella Velasquez
 Dominique Wendt
 Lauryn Winterhalder
 Ben Youngstone

Apprentices 

 Matisse D'Aloisio
 Kristoffer Reyes
 Wen Na Robertson

Performances

2008-2009 (Season 54)
Alice in Wonderland - October 23–26, 2008
The Nutcracker - December 6–23, 2008
Noches Calientes - February 12–15, 2009
Icons & Innovators - March 26–29, 2009
Beer & Ballet - April–May, 2009
Modern Masters - May 22–24, 2009

2007-2008 (Season 53)
A Woman's Journey: The Tamsen Donner Story - October 25–28, 2007
The Nutcracker - December 7–23, 2007
A Streetcar Named Desire - February 7–10, 2008
The Sleeping Beauty - March 20–22, 2008
A Celebration of Ron Cunningham's 20th Anniversary - April 25, 2008
Modern Masters - April 26-May 4, 2008
Beer & Ballet - May 7–17, 2008

2006-2007 (Season 52)
Where The Wild Things Are - October 26–29, 2006
The Nutty Nutcracker - December 2, 2006
The Nutcracker - December 8–23, 2006
The Taming of the Shrew- February 8–11, 2007
Nine Sinatra Songs - March 22–25, 2007
Beer & Ballet - February 24 - April 6, 2007
Tour to China - May 1–13, 2007

2005-2006 (Season 51)
Dracula - October 27–30, 2005
The Nutcracker - December 10–24, 2005
Carmina Burana - February 9–12, 2006
Scheherezade - March 30-April 2, 2006
Modern Masters - April 28-May 7, 2006
Beer & Ballet

2004-2005 (Season 50)
Dracula - October 28–31, 2004
The Nutcracker - December 10–24, 2004
Romeo and Juliet - February 10–13, 2005
The Firebird - March 24–27, 2005
Modern Masters - May 5–8, 2005
Beer & Ballet

References

Ballet companies in the United States
Dance in California
Culture of Sacramento, California
Tourist attractions in Sacramento, California
1954 establishments in California
Performing groups established in 1954
Non-profit organizations based in California